The Dingbian–Wuwei Expressway, commonly referred to as the Dingwu Expressway is an expressway that connects Dingbian County, Yulin, Shaanxi, People's Republic of China and Wuwei, Gansu. It is a spur of G20 Qingdao–Yinchuan Expressway.

The route is entirely completed.

References

Chinese national-level expressways
Expressways in Shaanxi
Expressways in Gansu
Expressways in Ningxia